Pirates Island is a 1990 Australian film about a group of children who are swept away in a balloon to an island where pirates run amok.

References

External links

Australian television films
1990 television films
1990 films
1990s English-language films
1990s Australian films